Minatitlán is the name of the following places in Mexico:

Minatitlán, Colima, in the Sierra Madre Occidental 
Minatitlán, Veracruz, along the Coatzacoalcos River